John Anthony (born 27 October 1953) is a former Australian rules footballer who played with St Kilda in the Victorian Football League (VFL).

Notes

External links 

Living people
1953 births
Australian rules footballers from Tasmania
St Kilda Football Club players
East Devonport Football Club players